Mamostong Kangri or Mamostang Kangri, surveyed as K35, is the highest peak in the remote Rimo Muztagh, a subrange of the Karakoram range in Ladakh union territory of India. It is located about 30 km east-southeast of the snout of the Siachen Glacier. It is the 48th-highest independent peak in the world (using a 500m prominence cutoff).

The South Chong Kumdan, Kichik Kumdan (Thangman Kangri), Mamostong, and South Terong Glaciers all head on the slopes of Mamostong Kangri.

Mamostong Kangri has not seen a great deal of visitation due to its remote location and the unsettled political and military situation in the region. The first European exploration of the peak was in 1907 by Arthur Neve and D. G. Oliver. The first ascent was made in 1984 by an Indo-Japanese expedition, via the Northeast Ridge, after a complicated approach. The summit party comprised N. Yamada, K. Yoshida, R. Sharma, P. Das, and H. Chauhan.

The Himalayan Index lists four additional ascents of this peak; however, two of these listings may refer to the same climb.

Summary of ascents

See also
 List of highest mountains
 List of Ultras of the Karakoram and Hindu Kush

References

Sources
 Jerzy Wala, Orographical Sketch Map of the Karakoram, Swiss Foundation for Alpine Research, Zurich, 1990.
 Jill Neate, High Asia: an illustrated history of the 7,000 metre peaks, The Mountaineers, 1989.

Mountains of Ladakh
Seven-thousanders of the Karakoram